The Estonian Olympic Committee (EOK) is responsible for the Estonia's participation in the Olympic Games.

History
The Estonian Sports Federation decided to form the Estonian Olympic Committee in the First Estonian Sport Congress on 30 November 1919, one and a half years after the proclamation of the independence of Estonia, but it was officially founded on 8 December 1923. The first chairman of the committee dr. Karl Friedrich Akel, was elected on 5 May 1924. An independent Estonian team took part in the Olympic Games over the period of 1920–1936. As Estonia was invaded and occupied in 1940, and reoccupied by the Soviet Union in 1944, the Estonian Olympic athletes competed as part of the USSR delegations at the Olympic Games from 1952 until 1988. 

The NOC was renewed on 14 January 1989 when the Estonian Olympic Sports Conference passed the following resolution: "to resume the activity of the Estonian Olympic Committee founded in 1923". The continuity concept became the foundation of the activity of the restored Estonian Olympic Committee since, although it could not act 'de facto' for 50 years, it never ceased its activity 'de jure'. On the same day, the first members of the renewed NOC were elected, Arnold Green and Atko Viru. On 20 August 1991 the independence of the Republic of Estonia was proclaimed and by decision of the Executive Board of the International Olympic Committee, at the board session in Berlin on 18 September 1991, the EOK was reintegrated into the Olympic Movement on 11 November 1991.

In 1992 the IOC delegation led by president Juan Antonio Samaranch visited Estonia. Delegation members included Vice President of the IOC and Russian Olympic Committee president – Vitali Smirnov, IOC and Swedish Olympic Committee member – Gunnar Ericsson, President of the EOC – Jacques Rogge and Secretary General of the EOC and Italian National Olympic Committee – Mario Pescante.

The 1992 Winter Olympics in Albertville, France was the first time since 1936 that the nation had competed as an independent nation at the Olympic Games. In the Games between, the Estonian athletes competed under the flag of the Soviet Union.

Structure
Members
Updated 15 April 2016.
Members of the Estonian Olympic Committee are:
102 legal persons under private law:
66 National Sports Federations
19 Regional Sports Associations
17 All-Estonian Sports Associations
19 natural persons:
Mati Alaver, (EOK member since 1999)
Jüri Jaanson
Gerd Kanter
Tõnu Laak, (1989)
Andres Lipstok, (1994)
Erki Nool
Neinar Seli
Tiit Nuudi, (1992)
Gunnar Paal (:et), (1989)
Indrek Pertelson, (2000)
Cardo Remmel, (1999)
Erika Salumäe, (1997)
Mart Siimann, (1999)
Kristina Šmigun 
Jaan Talts, (1989)
Mart Tarmak, (1989)
Toomas Tõnise, (1992)
Jaak Uudmäe, (1989)
Andrus Veerpalu, (2000)

Former natural members
 Mikk Mikiver (1937–2006) (EOK member 1989–2006)
 Aado Slutsk (1918–2006) (EOK member 1989–2006)

Current NOC leadership 
Updated 15 April 2016.
 President
 Urmas Sõõrumaa
 Vice President
 Jüri Tamm
 Tõnu Tõniste
 Secretary General
 Siim Sukles
 Executive Committee 
17 members incl. EOK President, 2 Vice Presidents and Secretary General.
 Urmas Sõõrumaa – EOK President
 Jüri Tamm – Vice President
 Tõnu Tõniste – Vice President
 Urmas Paet – President of the Estonian Paralympic Committee
 Anne Rei – General Secretary of the Estonian Football Association
 Karol Kovanen – President of the Estonian Badminton Federation and Estonian Swimming Federation
 Oliver Kruuda – President of the Estonian Handball Association
 Toomas Tõnise – Vice-President 2012–2016, General Secretary 2000-2012 of the Estonian Olympic Committee
 Marko Kaljuveer – President of the Estonian Golf Association
 Riho Terras – Commander-in-Chief of the Estonian Defence Forces
  Reet Hääl – Member of the Board of the Estonian Ski Association and Estonian Tennis Association
 Hanno Pevkur – President of the Estonian Volleyball Federation
 Mati Alaver – Member of the Board of the Estonian Trainers' Association
 Helir-Valdor Seeder – President of the Estonian Sports Association Jõud and member of the Board Estonian Handball Association
 Mihhail Kõlvart – President of the Estonian Taekwondo Federation and Estonian Fighting Sports Association
 Erki Nool – President of the Estonian Olympic Champions Network
 Kristjan Järvi –  Conductor and pianist. Advisor to the Kammerorchester Basel and the conductor and founder of the Baltic Youth Philharmonic. Since 2011 chief conductor of the MDR Symphony Orchestra
 Gerd Kanter – Leader of the Estonian Athletes' Commission

List of presidents
 Karl Friedrich Akel (1924–1931) – EOK Chairman
 Johan Laidoner (1931–1934) – EOK Cochairman
 Johan Laidoner (1934–1940) – EOK Chairman
 Arnold Green (1989–1997) – EOK President
 Tiit Nuudi (1997–2001) – EOK President
 Mart Siimann (2001-2012) – EOK President
 Neinar Seli (2012–2016) - EOK President
 Urmas Sõõrumaa (2016–present) - EOK President

IOC members
 Karl Friedrich Akel (1927–1932)
 Joakim Puhk (1936–1942)

Honorary members
 Arnold Green – Honorary president, former EOK member (1989–1999) and President of the EOK (1989–1997)
 Tiit Nuudi – Honorary president, former EOK member (1992–   ) and President of the EOK (1997–2001)
 August Englas – sportwrestling world champion 1953 & 1954
 Svetlana Tširkova-Lozovaja – Olympic champion 1968
 Aavo Pikkuus – Olympic champion 1976
 Mait Riisman – Olympic champion 1980
 Erika Salumäe – Olympic champion 1988 & 1992
 Oleg Sapožnin – former EOK member (1992–2001) and member of the Executive Committee
 Heino Sisask – former EOK member (1992–1999)
 Tiit Sokk – Olympic champion 1988
 Ivar Stukolkin – Olympic champion 1980
 Jaan Talts – Olympic champion 1972
 Jüri Tarmak – Olympic champion 1972
 Jaak Uudmäe – Olympic champion 1980
 Lembit Vahesaar – former EOK member (1992–2000)
  – former EOK member (1992–2016)
 Rein Haljand – former EOK member (1992–2000)
 Former honorary members
 Johannes Kotkas (1915–1998)
 Heino Lipp (1922–2006)
 Ruudi Toomsalu (1913–2002)
 Bruno Junk (1929–1995)
 Heino Lind (1931–2008) – former EOK member (1992–2001 ) and member of the Executive Committee
 Viljar Loor (1953-2011), Olympic champion 1980
 Ants Antson (1938-2015), Olympic champion 1964

Other notable members
Juhan Aare 1992–1997, Are Eller 1992–1993, Peeter Mardna 1992–2001, Mati Mark 1992–2001, Even Tudeberg 2000–2001, Ants Veetõusme 1992–2001, Priit Vilba 1994–2000, Atko Viru 1989–2007

See also
Estonia at the Olympics

References

External links
Estonian Olympic Committee Official Site
IOC-s information page of the NOC
Estonian Olympic Academy
Old official site of the Estonian Olympic Committee

National Olympic Committees
Olympic
Estonia at the Olympics
Sports organizations of Estonia
1923 establishments in Estonia
Sports organizations established in 1923